Old Spring Hill is an unincorporated community in Marengo County, Alabama, United States.

History
This village was settled in the early 19th century, with a Methodist church established in 1825 and a Baptist church in 1828. Prior to the American Civil War it had a male academy, female academy, Masonic lodge, and several stores.

The community was originally named Spring Hill, but a community by the same name near Mobile was granted a post office under that name after the Civil War, when Spring Hill had lost its post office.  In order to have a new post office established, the name was changed to Old Spring Hill.

Geography

References

Unincorporated communities in Alabama
Unincorporated communities in Marengo County, Alabama